Criticonoma is a genus of moths belonging to the family Tineidae.

Species
Criticonoma aspergata Gozmány & Vári, 1973
Criticonoma calligrapta Gozmány, 2004
Criticonoma chelonaea Meyrick, 1910
Criticonoma crassa Gozmány & Vári, 1973
Criticonoma doliopis (Meyrick, 1932)
Criticonoma episcardina (Gozmány, 1965)
Criticonoma esoterica (Gozmány, 1966)
Criticonoma flaveata (Gozmány, 1968)
Criticonoma gypsocoma (Meyrick, 1931)
Criticonoma phalacropis (Meyrick, 1915)

References

Myrmecozelinae